Jovan Lukić (born 22 September 1997) is a Serbian footballer who plays as a midfielder for Real Podunavci in the Serbian League West.

Career
On 28 June 2019, Lukić signed with FK Novi Pazar. However, he ended up joining FK Borac Čačak one month later.

Honours
Radnički Kragujevac
Serbian League West: 2016–17

References

External links
 
 Jovan Lukić stats at utakmica.rs 
 

1997 births
Living people
Sportspeople from Kragujevac
Association football forwards
Serbian footballers
FK Radnički 1923 players
FK Novi Pazar players
FK Borac Čačak players
Serbian First League players
Serbian SuperLiga players